It was a fort in the Roman province of Dacia.

See also
List of castra
Romania

Notes

External links
Roman castra from Romania - Google Maps / Earth

Roman legionary fortresses in Romania
Ancient history of Transylvania
Historic monuments in Mureș County
Târnăveni